Bulani (also Romanized as Būlānī) is a village in Sangan Rural District, in the Central District of Khash County, Sistan and Baluchestan Province, Iran. At the 2006 census, its population was 105, in 30 families.

References 

Populated places in Khash County